Mayors of Trondheim, the head of the city council of Trondheim, Norway.

Until 1963, the list contains the old Municipality of Trondheim, and since 1963 the enlarged municipality with the same name after the merger of the municipalities of Trondheim, Strinda, Leinstrand, Tiller and Byneset.

References

Trondheim
Trondheim